ECV may refer to:

In medicine
 Extracellular volume
 Effective circulating volume, a medical term
 External cephalic version, a method of manually turning a late-stage fetus to vertex position from a breech or transverse position

In education
 El Cajon Valley High School, an abbreviation for El Cajon Valley High School, El Cajon, CA, USA
 École de communication visuelle, a French school of graphic design

In politics
 Electoral college votes, in the US Presidential election system

In sports 
 Esporte Clube Vitória, a traditional sports club in Brazil

Other
 E Clampus Vitus, an organization dedicated to the history of California
 Ecuato Guineana, an airline with the ICAO Code ECV
 ECV, a computer virus, see Comparison of computer viruses
 Essential Climate Variables, a set of systematically observable variables for climate assessment
 Lancia ECV, a rally car
 Electrochemical capacitance-voltage, a form of capacitance–voltage profiling
 Unidad de Valor Constante, a former currency of Ecuador which had the ISO 4217 currency code ECV
 Expected Commercial Value
 Exhaust Control Valve
 Extended Content Verification, a technique for load balancers to perform health checks on service instances and monitor health of services
 Electric Convenience Vehicle, another name for a mobility scooter

pt:ECV